The Fels Formation is a geologic formation in Austria. It preserves fossils dated to the Burdigalian age of the Miocene period.

See also 
 List of fossiliferous stratigraphic units in Austria

References 

Geologic formations of Austria
Miocene Series of Europe
Neogene Austria
Burdigalian
Sandstone formations
Paleontology in Austria